Indori Poha (Poha of Indore) is a type of flattened (beaten) rice that is likely to have originated in Indian metropolis of Indore. It contains steamed Poha (flattened rice) and is usually served with a unique combination of Jalebi (called Poha-Jalebi combined), Sev, Usal, sliced onions and fennel seeds.

Unlike the other varieties of Poha found across India, Indori Poha is cooked in steam instead of being cooked directly with other ingredients. This provides Indori Poha its distinct taste, softness, and flavor. Vendors generally prefer pea instead of peanuts as opposed to the traditional Pohay of India. Indori Poha is generally served with Jalebi.

History
Indori Poha resembles its name from the city of Indore being its place of origin. It is believed that it was created after India's independence (1947). Recipe of Indori Poha though differs from vendors to vendors, generally it comes with a blend of North and Central Indian spices, snacks and namkeen.

Indori Poha is mainly sold by vendors all around the city during morning time, often alongside the city's other popular snacks "Kachori-Samosas". It is also available in nearby cities Ujjain, Dewas, Sagar, Dhar, Ratlam and Bhopal and is becoming a very popular cuisine in Maharashtra, Gujarat, Uttar Pradesh and Bihar.

References 

Rice dishes
Indian snack foods
Indian rice dishes
Indore